In mathematics, Dodgson condensation or method of contractants is a method of computing the determinants of square matrices. It is named for its inventor, Charles Lutwidge Dodgson (better known by his pseudonym, as Lewis Carroll, the popular author). The method in the case of an n × n matrix is to construct an (n − 1) × (n − 1) matrix, an (n − 2) × (n − 2), and so on, finishing with a 1 × 1 matrix, which has one entry, the determinant of the original matrix.

General method
This algorithm can be described in the following four steps:
 Let A be the given n × n matrix. Arrange A so that no zeros occur in its interior. One can do this using any operation that one could normally perform without changing the value of the determinant, such as adding a multiple of one row to another.
 Create an (n − 1) × (n − 1) matrix B, consisting of the determinants of every 2 × 2 submatrix of A. Explicitly, we write 
 Using this (n − 1) × (n − 1) matrix, perform step 2 to obtain an (n − 2) × (n − 2) matrix C. Divide each term in C by the corresponding term in the interior of A so .
 Let A = B, and B = C. Repeat step 3 as necessary until the 1 × 1 matrix is found; its only entry is the determinant.

Examples

Without zeros
One wishes to find

All of the interior elements are non-zero, so there is no need to re-arrange the matrix.

We make a matrix of its 2 × 2 submatrices.

We then find another matrix of determinants:

We must then divide each element by the corresponding element of our original matrix. The interior of the original matrix is
, so after dividing we get
.
The process must be repeated to arrive at a 1 × 1 matrix.

Dividing by the interior of the 3 × 3 matrix, which is just −5, gives  and −8 is indeed the determinant of the original matrix.

With zeros
Simply writing out the matrices:

Here we run into trouble. If we continue the process, we will eventually be dividing by 0. We can perform four row exchanges on the initial matrix to preserve the determinant and repeat the process, with most of the determinants precalculated:

Hence, we arrive at a determinant of 36.

Desnanot–Jacobi identity and proof of correctness of the condensation algorithm
The proof that the condensation method computes the determinant of the matrix if no divisions by zero are encountered is based on an identity known as the Desnanot–Jacobi identity (1841) or, more generally the Sylvester determinant identity (1851).

Similarly, for

Desnanot–Jacobi identity

Proof of the correctness of Dodgson condensation
Rewrite the identity as

Now note that by induction it follows that when applying the Dodgson condensation procedure to a square matrix  of order , the matrix in the -th stage of the computation (where the first stage  corresponds to the matrix  itself) consists of all the connected minors of order 

Proof of the Desnanot-Jacobi identity
We follow the treatment in Bressoud's book; for an alternative combinatorial proof see the paper by Zeilberger.
Denote  (up to sign, the -th minor of ), and define a 
matrix  by

The identity is now obtained by computing  in two ways. First, we can directly compute the matrix product  (using simple properties of the adjugate matrix, or alternatively using the formula for the expansion of a matrix determinant in terms of a row or a column)
to arrive at

Second, this is equal to the product of the determinants, . But clearly

Notes

References and further reading
 Bressoud, David M., Proofs and Confirmations: The Story of the Alternating Sign Matrix Conjecture, MAA Spectrum, Mathematical Associations of America, Washington, D.C., 1999.
 Bressoud, David M. and Propp, James, How the alternating sign matrix conjecture was solved, Notices of the American Mathematical Society, 46 (1999), 637-646.
 
 Knuth, Donald, Overlapping Pfaffians, Electronic Journal of Combinatorics, 3 no. 2 (1996).
 
 Mills, William H., Robbins, David P., and Rumsey, Howard, Jr., Proof of the Macdonald conjecture, Inventiones Mathematicae, 66 (1982), 73-87.
 Mills, William H., Robbins, David P., and Rumsey, Howard, Jr., Alternating sign matrices and descending plane partitions, Journal of Combinatorial Theory, Series A, 34 (1983), 340-359.
 Zeilberger, Doron, Dodgson's determinant evaluation rule proved by two-timing men and women, Electronic Journal of Combinatorics, 4  no. 2 (1997).

External links
 

Determinants
Lewis Carroll